The following is a list of notable current and former fast food restaurant chains, as distinct from fast casual restaurants (see List of casual dining restaurant chains), coffeehouses (see List of coffeehouse chains), ice cream parlors (see List of ice cream parlor chains), and pizzerias (see List of pizza chains).

International chains

 85°C Bakery Cafe
 A&W Restaurants
 Adyar Ananda Bhavan
 Arby's 
 Auntie Anne's
 Big Boy Restaurants
 Blaze Pizza
 Buffalo Wild Wings
 Burger King
 California Pizza Kitchen
 Carl's Jr.
 Chick-fil-A
 Chipotle Mexican Grill
 Church's Chicken
 Cinnabon
 Dairy Queen
 Domino's Pizza
 Dunkin' Donuts
 Five Guys
 Hardee's
 Jollibee 
 KFC
 Little Caesars
 Long John Silver's
 Marco's Pizza
 McDonald's
 Panda Express
 Papa John's Pizza
 Peter Piper Pizza
 The Pizza Company
 Pizza Hut
 Pizza Inn
 Pollo Campero
 Pollo Tropical
 Popeyes
 Quiznos
 Qdoba
 Red Lobster
 Red Robin
 Sbarro
 Shake Shack
 Smoothie King
 Starbucks
 Subway
 Sweet Frog
 Taco Bell
 TCBY
 Tim Hortons
 Wendy's
 White Castle
 Wingstop
 WingStreet

Companies by country/region of origin

Africa

Egypt

 Cook Door
 Mo'men

Nigeria

 Mr Bigg's
 Tantalizers
 Tastee Fried Chicken
 Kilimanjaro
 Chicken Republic

South Africa

 Chicken Licken
 Nando's
 Steers
 Wimpy (restaurant)

Asia

China

 Dicos
 East Dawning
 Mr. Lee
 Kungfu
 Da Niang Dumpling
 Xiabu Xiabu
 Goubuli

Hong Kong 
 Cafe de Coral
 Fairwood
 Maxim MX

India

 Adyar Anandha Bhavan
 Amul Restaurants
 Bikanervala
 Burgs
 Cafe Coffee Day
 Darshini
 Goli Vada Pav
 Haldiram's
 Jumbo King
 KaatiZone
 Karachi Bakery
 Nirula's
 Saravana Bhavan
 Smokin' Joe's
 Vadilal
 Wow! Momo

Indonesia

 CFC
 Es Teler 77
 Geprek Bensu
 HokBen
 J.CO Donuts & Coffee
 Kebab Turki Baba Rafi
 Klenger Burger
 Restoran Sederhana

Israel

 Burgeranch

Japan

 Ajisen Ramen
 First Kitchen
 Freshness Burger
 Hokka Hokka Tei
 Hotto Motto
 Ichibanya
 Italian Tomato
 Kura
 Lotteria
 Marugame Seimen
 Matsuya Foods Co.
 MOS Burger
 Pepper Lunch 
 Sukiya
 Yoshinoya
Sushiro

Malaysia

 The Chicken Rice Shop
 Kuai Lee Gee Happy Chicken
 Marrybrown
 Pelita Nasi Kandar
 Rotiboy
 Sate Kajang Haji Samuri
 Secret Recipe (restaurant)
 SCR

Mongolia
Ramesen itsukyutrite

Philippines 

 Chowking
 Goldilocks Bakeshop
 Jollibee 
 Mang Inasal
 Max's of Manila
 Nacho King!
 Red Ribbon
 Tokyo Tokyo

Saudi Arabia

 Shawarmer
 Al Baik
 Al Tazaj
 Herfy
 Kudu

Singapore

 Old Chang Kee
 Sakae Sushi

South Korea 

 Lotteria
 Paris Baguette
 Caffe Bene
 Tom N Toms Coffee
 Angel-in-us
 A Twosome Place
 KyoChon
 Bonchon Chicken
 Mom's Touch
 Mr. Pizza

Taiwan

 85C Bakery Cafe
 TKK Fried Chicken

Thailand

 Café Amazon
 The Pizza Company

United Arab Emirates

 Al Farooj Fresh
 ChicKing

Europe

Belgium

 Quick

Finland

 Hesburger
 Rolls

France

 Brioche Dorée
 Flunch
 O'Tacos

Germany

 Ditsch
 Kochlöffel
 Nordsee
 Wienerwald

Greece

 Goody's

Iceland

 Metro

Ireland

 Abrakebabra
 Apache Pizza
 Eddie Rocket's
 Four Star Pizza
 O'Briens Irish Sandwich Bars
 Supermac's

Italy

 Spizzico

Netherlands 

 FEBO

Norway

 Big Bite Submarines
 Peppes Pizza

Russia

 Teremok
 Dodo Pizza
 Vkusno i tochka

Spain

 Cervecería 100 Montaditos
 Rodilla

Sweden

 Max Hamburgers
 Frasses
 Sibylla

United Kingdom

 Barburrito
 Benjys
 Ben's Cookies
 Chicken Cottage
 Dixy Chicken
 Eat
 Franco Manca
 Greggs
 Harry Ramsden's
 itsu
 Leon
 Little Chef
 Millie's Cookies
 Morley's
 Pret a Manger
 Sam's Chicken
 Southern Fried Chicken
 Spudulike
 Tortilla
 Upper Crust
 Wasabi
 West Cornwall Pasty Company
 Wimpy
 YO! Sushi

North America

Barbados
 

 Chefette

Canada

 A&W
 Booster Juice
 Burger Baron
 Captain Submarine
 Chez Ashton
 Coffee Time
 Country Style
 Extreme Pita
 Freshii
 Fryer's
 Harvey's
 Hero Certified Burgers
 King of Donair
 La Belle Province
 Lafleur Restaurants
 Mary Brown's
 Mr. Sub
 New York Fries
 Pita Pit
 Pizza Pizza
 Robin's Donuts
 Tim Hortons
 Valentine
 White Spot
 Yogen Früz

Guatemala

 Pollo Campero

Mexico

 El Pollo Loco

Trinidad and Tobago

 Mario's Pizzeria
 Royal Castle

United States

 A&W Restaurants
 Applebee's
 Arby's
 Arctic Circle Restaurants
 Arthur Treacher's
 Atlanta Bread Company
 Au Bon Pain
 Auntie Anne's
 Baja Fresh
 Baskin-Robbins
 Blake's Lotaburger
 Blimpie
 Bojangles' Famous Chicken 'n Biscuits
 Boston Market
 Braum's
 Buffalo Wild Wings
 Burger King
 Burger Street
 Burgerville
 California Pizza Kitchen 
 Captain D's Seafood Kitchen
 Carino's Italian
 Carl's Jr.
 Charleys Philly Steaks
 Checkers and Rally's
 Cheeburger Cheeburger
 Chicken Express
 Chick-fil-A
 Chipotle Mexican Grill
 Chuck-A-Rama
 Chuck E. Cheese
 Church's / Texas Chicken
 Cinnabon
 Coco's Bakery
 Cold Stone Creamery
 Cook Out
 Corner Bakery Cafe
 Culver's
 Dairy Queen
 Dave's Hot Chicken
 Denny's
 Del Taco
 DiBella's
 Dixie Chili and Deli
 Domino's Pizza
 Duchess
 Duck Donuts
 Dunkin' Donuts
 Eegee's
 El Chico
 El Pollo Loco
 El Taco Tote
 Elevation Burger
 Farmer Boys
 Fatburger
 Firehouse Subs
 Five Guys Burgers and Fries
 Fosters Freeze
 Freddy's Frozen Custard & Steakburgers
 Gold Star Chili
 Golden Chick
 Good Times Burgers & Frozen Custard
 Green Burrito / Red Burrito
 The Habit Burger Grill
 The Halal Guys
 Hardee's
 Huddle House
 IHOP
 In-N-Out Burger
 Jack in the Box
 Jack's
 Jamba Juice
 Jason's Deli
 Jersey Mike's Subs
 Jimmy John's
 Jim's Restaurants
 Johnny Rockets
 KFC
 Kewpee
 Krispy Kreme
 Krystal
 L&L Hawaiian Barbecue
 Ledo Pizza
 Lee's Famous Recipe Chicken
 Lion's Choice
 Little Caesars
 Long John Silver's
 Maid-Rite
 Marco's Pizza
 McAlister's Deli
 McDonald's
 Milo's Hamburgers
 MOD Pizza
 Moe's Southwest Grill
 Mooyah
 Mrs. Fields
 Mrs. Winner's Chicken & Biscuits
 MrBeast Burger
 Noodles & Company
 Panera Bread
 Panda Express
 Papa John's Pizza
 Papa Murphy's
 Penn Station East Coast Subs
 Pita Pit
 Pizza Hut
 Pizza Inn
 Planet Smoothie
 Pollo Tropical
 Popeyes
 Port of Subs
 Potbelly Sandwich Works
 Qdoba
 Quizno's Classic Subs
 Raising Cane's Chicken Fingers
 Rax
 Red Lobster
 Red Robin
 Robeks
 Roy Rogers Restaurants
 Ruby Tuesday
 Salad and Go
 Saladworks
 Sarku Japan
 Sbarro
 Schlotzsky's
 Seattle's Best Coffee
 Shake Shack
 Skyline Chili
 Smashburger
 Sneaky Pete's
 Sonic Drive-In
 Spangles
 Starbucks 
 Steak Escape
 Stir Crazy
 Subway
 SuperDeluxe
 Swensen's
 Swensons
 Taco del Mar
 Taco Bell
 Taco Bueno
 Taco Cabana
 Taco John's
 Taco Mayo
 Taco Tico
 Taco Time
 Tim Hortons
 Tudor's Biscuit World
 Twin Peaks
 Umami Burger
 Wendy's
 Wetzel's Pretzels
 Whataburger
 White Castle
 Wienerschnitzel
 Wingstop
 Zaxby's
 Zip's Drive-in
 Zippy's

Puerto Rico 

 Martin's BBQ
 El Meson Sandwiches
 Taco Maker

Oceania

Australia

 Boost Juice
 Chicken Treat
 Donut King
 Eagle Boys
 Hungry Jack's (Burger King)
 La Porchetta Pronto
 Michel's Patisserie
 Noodle Box
 Oporto
 Pancake Parlour
 Red Rooster 
 Sumo Salad
 Zambrero

New Zealand

 BurgerFuel
 Georgie Pie
 Hell Pizza
 Fergburger
 Cobb & Co.

Papua New Guinea

Big Rooster

South America

Argentina

 California Burrito Co.
 Mostaza

Brazil

 Bob's
 Giraffas
 Habib's
 Koni Store
 Mini Kalzone
 Rei do Mate
 Spoleto

Colombia

 Hamburguesas El Corral
 Pollos Frisby

Peru

 Bembos

Venezuela

 Churromania

Parent companies

 CKE Restaurants owns Carl's Jr. / Green Burrito, and Hardee's / Red Burrito dual-branded chains.
 Dunkin' Brands (Defunct 2020) owns Dunkin' Donuts and Baskin-Robbins.
 Focus Brands owns Auntie Anne's, Carvel, Cinnabon, Moe's Southwest Grill, and Schlotzsky's.
 Kahala Brands owns Great Steak.
 The Wendy's Company owns Wendy's and T.J. Cinnamons
 Yum! Brands (spun-off from PepsiCo in 1997) owns KFC, Taco Bell, and Pizza Hut restaurants outside of China.
 Yum China owns KFC, Taco Bell, Pizza Hut, East Dawning and Little Sheep restaurants in China.

See also

 List of the largest fast food restaurant chains
 List of chicken restaurants
 List of restaurant chains
 List of revolving restaurants
 Lists of restaurants

References

Fast food